Tetrabaena socialis is a microscopic species of green algae and one of the simplest multicellular organisms, consisting of four cells. It is a motile flagellate, possessing 2 flagella per cell.

References

Articles containing video clips
Chlamydomonadales